Macrurocyttus acanthopodus, the dwarf dory, is a species of tinselfish native to the western Pacific Ocean where it has been found in the waters around the Philippines and Australia at a depth of around .  This species is the only known member of its genus.

References
 

Grammicolepididae
Fish described in 1934